Katiki Domokou (Greek: Κατίκι Δομοκού) is a cheese made of goat and sheep milk. Its origin is from Domokos in Phthiotis prefecture. It has white color. It is a soft cheese with low fat content. The average nutritional value of 100 gr of the product is 169 kcal, 10 gr proteins, 3 gr hydrocarbons and 13 gr fats. It is a traditional product with protected designation of origin. It is made from pasteurised milk that curdles without rennet and it is drained in bags made of cloth. It is available for sale in many supermarkets.

It can be served in toast or dakos. It can be added in salad as an ingredient and it fills pitas.

References 

Greek cheeses
Goat's-milk cheeses
Sheep's-milk cheeses